The Sambalpur–Puri Intercity Express is an Intercity train belonging to East Coast Railway zone that runs between  and  in India. It is currently being operated with 18303/18304 train numbers on a daily basis. It was introduced in 2002 and one of the oldest trains on Cuttack–Sambalpur line.

Service

The 18303/Sambalpur–Puri Intercity Express has an average speed of 52 km/hr and covers 341 km in 6h 35m. The 18304/Puri–Sambalpur Intercity Express has an average speed of 52 km/hr and covers 341 km in 6h 35m.

Route and halts 

The important halts of the train are:

 
Sambalpur road
Jujomura
Rairakhol
Bamur
Boinda
Jarapada
Boinda
 
 
Meramadoli
 
Naraj Marthapur

Coach composition

The train has standard ICF Utkrisht rakes with a max speed of 110 kmph. The train consists of 16 coaches:

 2 AC Chair Car
 2 Second Sitting
 10 General Unreserved
 2 Seating cum Luggage Rake

Traction

It is hauled by Visakhapatnam Loco Shed-based WAP-4 or WAP-7 electric locomotive from Sambalpur to Puri end to end

See also 

 Sambalpur Junction railway station
 Puri railway station

Notes

References

External links 

 18303/Sambalpur–Puri Intercity Express India Rail Info
 18304/Puri–Sambalpur Intercity Express India Rail Info

Intercity Express (Indian Railways) trains
Rail transport in Odisha
Transport in Sambalpur
Transport in Puri
Railway services introduced in 2002